Fukiage Station (吹上駅) is the name of two train stations in Japan:

 Fukiage Station (Nagoya) in Nagoya, Aichi Prefecture.
 Fukiage Station (Saitama)